La Quebrada can refer to:

La Quebrada, Venezuela, also known as La Quebrada de San Roque, capital of Urdaneta Municipality, Trujillo.
La Quebrada, Mexico, famous diving spot in Acapulco.
La Quebrada, an springboard moonsault attack used in professional wrestling invented by Yoshihiro Asai, better known by his gimmick name Último Dragón.
 La Quebrada (Mexibús), a BRT station in Cuautitlán Izcalli, Mexico